The 1960–61 season was the 59th in the history of the Western Football League.

The champions for the second time in their history were Salisbury. This season was the first to feature a single division since 1945–46, with many clubs having left the league at the end of the 1959–60 season.

Final table
The new single division consisted of 21 clubs after Division Two was scrapped. Bridgwater Town Reserves, Chippenham United, Clandown, Dorchester Town Reserves, Frome Town, Gloucester City Reserves, Paulton Rovers, Peasedown Miners Welfare, Radstock Town, Stonehouse, Street, Taunton Town Reserves and Wells City all left the league. One new club joined:

Exeter City Reserves, rejoining after leaving the league in 1935.

References

1960-61
5